ZD30 may refer to:

Nissan ZD engine
Zero Dark Thirty